Central Fire Station, Yangon is a colonial-era landmark in Yangon, Myanmar of historical significance, and designated on the Yangon City Heritage List. The building continues to be used as a fire station.

The building was built in 1912, designed by the British firm United Engineers Limited. It was built to house Rangoon's fire brigade, which had been established by the Rangoon Municipal Committee in 1883. The municipality acquired a plot of land on Sule Pagoda Road at a cost of 40,000 rupees. The building, built in the Edwardian style, is noted for its  octagonal watchtower, and was one of the first iron-frame buildings in Yangon.

References 

Government buildings in Myanmar
Buildings and structures in Yangon
Buildings and structures completed in 1912
Edwardian architecture